"Colorblind " is a song by American rock band Counting Crows. Written by band members Adam Duritz and Charlie Gillingham for their third album This Desert Life (1999), production was helmed by Dennis Herring and David Lowery. It was prominently featured in the 1999 drama film Cruel Intentions starring Sarah Michelle Gellar, Ryan Phillippe, Reese Witherspoon, and Selma Blair, and has since been covered by various artists, including Between the Buried and Me (who were named after a section of lyrics in the song "Ghost Train" from the first Counting Crows album August and Everything After), Leona Lewis (for Hurt: The EP), and Natalie Walker. A choral cover recorded by Scala & Kolacny Brothers was also featured in the TV series Manhattan (Season 2, Episode 5, "The World Of Tomorrow").

Charts

Weekly charts

Leona Lewis version

In December 2011, British recording artist Leona Lewis released a three-track extended play entitled Hurt: The EP, which included a cover version of "Colorblind" as well as two other covers. Lewis re-recorded an acoustic version of the song for inclusion on the deluxe edition of her third studio album Glassheart (2012). Fraser T Smith served as the song's producer.

References

1999 songs
Counting Crows songs
Leona Lewis songs
Song recordings produced by Fraser T. Smith
Songs written by Adam Duritz
Songs written by Charlie Gillingham
Songs written by David Bryson
Songs written by David Immerglück
Songs written by Dan Vickrey